Carl Riskin is an American economist, Distinguished Professor Emeritus at Queens College, City University of New York and the CUNY graduate school. He also taught at Columbia University, where he was a senior research scholar and remains a research associate.

Publications
Income and Inequality in China, A. R. Khan, K. Griffin, C. Riskin and Zhao Renwei, “Household income and its distribution in China,” The China Quarterly, No. 132 (12, 1992), pp. 1029–1061 
 Chinese Rural Poverty: Marginalized or Dispersed? Carl Riskin - The American Economic Review - Vol. 84, No. 2, Papers and Proceedings of the Hundred and Sixth Annual Meeting of the American Economic Association (May, 1994), pp. 281–284 
 Carl Riskin on Google Scholar

References

External links

Year of birth missing (living people)
Living people
Queens College, City University of New York faculty
Columbia University faculty
American economists
Harvard University alumni
University of California, Berkeley alumni